Noviana Sari (born 1984) is an Indonesian powerlifter. She won gold medal at the 2009 World Games. In the Asian Championships, she won six gold medals, four gold medals won in a row. In the World Championships she won three silver medals and three bronze medals.

Career
Noviana Sari started her career by training at the Padepokan Gajah Lampung, this is a place for powerlifting and weightlifting athletes who will compete in national and international championships.

References

1984 births
Living people
People from Pringsewu Regency
Indonesian powerlifters